Alexandru III cel Rău (Alexander III the Bad, died 20 March 1597) was the Prince of Wallachia between November 1592 and 1593. He was the son of Bogdan Lăpușneanu, former Prince of Moldavia. Although Alexandru had in his government both local Boyars and Greeks, complaints arose to the Ottoman Empire in June 1593 accusing the Prince of behaving like a tyrant just like his uncle, Prince of Moldavia, Aaron the Tyrant.

He married the widow of Petru Cercel, which politically wasn't a favourable choice as the Cantacuzino family was better regarded by the Ottomans. On 2–12 September 1593, Mihai Viteazu was chosen as the new Prince of Wallachia. Alexander was exiled to Constantinople, where he was accused of conspiracy against the Sublime Porte and executed by strangulation 20 March 1597.

Alexander had a son Petru, who died 8 June 1619.

References

 

Rulers of Wallachia
16th-century rulers in Europe
16th-century Romanian people
1597 deaths